Susie Lewis is an American writer and producer who co-created the MTV animated series Daria.

Personal life 
Lewis attended Temple University in Philadelphia, Pennsylvania, and graduated from New York Institute of Technology in New York City.

Career 
Lewis's career began after she applied for an internship at MTV and then began working on Beavis and Butt-Head producing the music video segments. She chose and edited the videos that the duo watched and oversaw the writing and recording of their comments. She and Glenn Eichler were later asked to become co-creators for a spin-off of the show called Daria, built around the character Daria Morgendorffer, who originally appeared as the intelligent, sarcastic foil to Beavis and Butthead. Daria came at a request for a "show for girls" from MTV executives, so it was fitting that one of the co-creators would be a woman, and that women would be a significant presence on the writing and directing teams.

Filmography

References

External links

Living people
American television producers
American women television producers
American television writers
American voice actresses
Year of birth missing (living people)
American women television writers
People from Oceanside, New York
Temple University alumni
21st-century American women